Vibrations is an album by vibraphonist Milt Jackson featuring performances recorded in 1960 and 1961 and released on the Atlantic label in 1964.

Reception
The Allmusic review awarded the album 3 stars.

Track listing
All compositions by Milt Jackson except as indicated
 "Darbin and The Redd Fox" (James Moody) - 4:56  
 "Algo Bueno" (Dizzy Gillespie) - 4:12 
 "Mallets Towards None" (Tom McIntosh) - 4:33  
 "Blue Jubilee" (McIntosh) - 4:27  
 "Vibrations" - 3:57  
 "Let Me Hear the Blues" - 6:04
 "Melancholy Blues" - 3:20
 "Sweet Georgia Brown" (Ben Bernie, Maceo Pinkard, Kenneth Casey) - 4:57
Recorded in New York City on February 23, 1960 (tracks 3 & 4), February 24, 1960 (tracks 1, 2, 6 & 8) and March 14, 1961 (tracks 5 & 7)

Personnel
Milt Jackson – vibes
Henry Boozier - trumpet (tracks 1-4 & 8)
Tom McIntosh - trombone (tracks 1-4 & 8)
Jimmy Heath - tenor saxophone (tracks 1-4, 6 & 8)
Tate Houston - baritone saxophone (tracks 1-4 & 8)
Kenny Burrell - guitar (tracks 5 & 7)
Tommy Flanagan - piano
George Duvivier (tracks 5 & 7), Alvin Jackson (tracks 1-4, 6 & 8) - bass
Connie Kay - drums

References 

Atlantic Records albums
Milt Jackson albums
1964 albums
Albums produced by Nesuhi Ertegun